Lovington may refer to:

 Lovington, Illinois, United States
 Lovington, New Mexico, United States
 Lovington, Somerset, England